Intelsat 510, previously named Intelsat VA F-10, was a communications satellite operated by Intelsat. Launched in 1985, it was the tenth of fifteen Intelsat V satellites to be launched. The Intelsat V series was constructed by Ford Aerospace, based on the Intelsat-VA satellite bus. Intelsat VA F-10 was part of an advanced series of satellites designed to provide greater telecommunications capacity for Intelsat's global network.

Launch 
The satellite was successfully launched into space on 22 March 1985, at 23:55:00 UTC, by means of an Atlas-Centaur G vehicle from the Cape Canaveral Air Force Station, Florida, United States. It had a launch mass of 2013 kg. The Intelsat 510 was equipped with 6 Ku-band transponders more 26 C-band transponders for 15,000 audio circuits and 2 TV channels.

References 

Spacecraft launched in 1985
Intelsat satellites
SES satellites